The badminton mixed doubles tournament at the 2012 Olympic Games in London took place from 28 July to 3 August at Wembley Arena.

The draw was held on 23 July 2012. Thirty-two players from 14 nations competed in the event.

The Chinese team of Zhang Nan and Zhao Yunlei won the gold medal, defeating Xu Chen and Ma Jin, also from China, in the final. Denmark pairing Joachim Fischer Nielsen and Christinna Pedersen won the bronze.

Competition format
The tournament started with a group phase round-robin followed by a knockout stage.

Seeds

  (gold medallists)
  (silver medallists)
  (bronze medallists)
  (fourth place)

Results

Group stage

Group A

Group B

Group C

Group D

Finals

References

External links
Results at tournamentsoftware.com

Badminton at the 2012 Summer Olympics
2012
Mixed events at the 2012 Summer Olympics